Ruger is a common shortened name for American firearms manufacturer Sturm, Ruger & Co.

'''Ruger may also refer to:

People
Ruger (surname)

Ruger (singer)

Other
Fort Ruger, a fort on the island of Oʻahu that served as the first military reservation in the Territory of Hawaii
Ruger Hauer, a hip hop and rap group from Helsinki, Finland
Ruger Lake, located in Glacier National Park, in the U. S. state of Montana

See also 
 Rüger